Jiří Ventruba (2 February 1950 – 9 March 2021) was a Czech neurosurgeon and politician.

Biography
He was born in Brno, Czechoslovakia. He was a member of the Chamber of Deputies of the Czech Republic from 2017 until his death on 9 March 2021, in Prague from COVID-19 during the COVID-19 pandemic in Czech Republic.

References

1950 births
2021 deaths
Czech neurosurgeons
Czech politicians
Civic Democratic Party (Czech Republic) politicians
Members of the Chamber of Deputies of the Czech Republic (2017–2021)
Masaryk University alumni
People from Brno
People from Modřice
Deaths from the COVID-19 pandemic in the Czech Republic